Mejia Thermal Power Station is located at Durlabhpur, Bankura, 35 km from Durgapur city in West Bengal. The power plant is one of the coal based power plants of DVC. Commissioned on 1996, MTPS is the largest thermal power plant, in terms of generating capacity in the state of West Bengal as well as among other DVC power plants.

Power Plant
Mejia Thermal Power Station has an installed capacity of 2430 MW. The plant has 8 units under operation. The individual units has the generating capacity as follows:

Units 1 through 6 are collectively named MTPS- A, while the extension work of 2×500 MW Units 7 & 8 are called MTPS-B. All the units have BHEL make boilers, turbines and generators installed in them.

See also 

 List of power stations in West Bengal
 Chandrapura Thermal Power Station 
 Bokaro Thermal Power Station B 
 Durgapur Thermal Power Station

References 

Coal-fired power stations in West Bengal
Bankura district
Energy infrastructure completed in 1996
1996 establishments in West Bengal